The 2017 Taça 12 de Novembro is the 5th staging of the Taça 12 de Novembro. The season began on 29 September 2017 and was finished in the final match on 28 October 2017.

Ponta Leste will enter as the defending champions after winning the 2016 edition by defeating Assalam 1–0 in the final.

Schedule and format

Stadiums 
 Primary venues used in the 2017 Taça 12 de Novembro:

Qualified teams
The following teams are qualified for the competition.

First round
This round match held between 29 September and 10 October 2017. Draw held on 26 September 2017.

|-

|}

Second round
This round match held between 11 and 15 October 2017. Draw held on 26 September 2017.

|-

|}

Third round
This round match held on 17 October 2017. Draw held on 26 September 2017. SL Benfica, DIT and Carsae received a bye.

|-

|}

Semifinals
This round match held between 21 and 22 October 2017. Draw held on 26 September 2017.

|-

|}

Final
This round match held on 28 October 2017 in Kampo Demokrasia, Dili. 

|-

|}

Goalscorers 
10 goals

 Bernardo Fereira (Atlético Ultramar)

9 goals

 Edit Savio (Carsae)

7 goals

 Chiquito do Carmo (Ponta leste)

5 goals

 Fábio Christian (Atlético Ultramar)
 Frangcyatma Alves (Cacusan)
 Emílio da Silva (Carsae)

3 goals

 Juvinal Cardoso (Cacusan)
 Gaudencio Monteiro (Cacusan)

2 goals

 Glaucho Trajano (Atlético Ultramar)
 Ozorio Gusmão (Café)
 Henrique Cruz (Carsae)
 Ricardo Mendonca (DIT)
 Luis Soares (Lica-Lica Lemorai)
 Silveiro Garcia (Ponta leste)
 Feliciano Goncalves (Ponta leste)
 Fernando Asmarov (Porto Taibesse)
 Aquilis Ximenes (Santa Cruz)
 Nidio Alves (SL Benfica)
 Daniel Adade (Zebra)

1 goals

 Bendito Ramos (Académica)
 Januario de Jesus (Aitana)
 Bernabe Soares (Atlético Ultramar)
 Orlando Correa (Benfica Dili)
 João Freitas (Benfica Dili)
 Juvinal Boavida (Cacusan)
 Rufino Gama (Cacusan)
 Giovanio Alberto (Carsae)
 Constantinto Pinto (Carsae)
 Pelazio da Costa (DIT)
 João Santos (DIT)
 José Santos (DIT)
 Xavier (Kablaky)
 Abrão da Costa (Nagarjo)
 Jose da Costa (Nagarjo)
 Hidetaka Kamimura (Nagarjo)
 Filipe Borges (Porto Taibesse)
 Faustino de Jesus (Santa Cruz)
 Rivaldo Correa (Zebra)

References

External links
Official website
Official Facebook page

Taça 12 de Novembro
Timor-Leste